Antonio Lázaro da Silva, better known as Irmão Lázaro (Salvador, Bahia; 9 November 1966 – Feira de Santana; 19 March 2021) was a Brazilian gospel singer and politician who served as a Deputy from 2015 to 2019.

References

1966 births
2021 deaths
Members of the Chamber of Deputies (Brazil) from Bahia
Deaths from the COVID-19 pandemic in Bahia